The Palau de la Música de València is a concert, cinema, arts, and exhibition hall in València situated on the Riu Túria. It is the home of the city's municipal orchestra, the Orchestra of Valencia founded 1943. (not to be confused with the Orquestra de la Comunitat Valenciana founded 2006).

References

External links
 Official website

Buildings and structures in Valencia